Thomas Bondhus (February 3, 1880 – January 5, 1954) was a state representative for Minnesota's 10th district serving Cottonwood County.

Personal life
Bondhus was born on February 3, 1880, in Clinton County, Iowa He moved to Ida County with his parents when he was 3 years old and moved to Minnesota's Cottonwood County in 1895. He married Carrie T. Thompson in 1908 and had 7 children—4 boys and 3 girls. He resided in Storden, Minnesota, throughout his career as a legislator. In addition to government work, Bondhus worked as a farmer and served as secretary of Westbrook Mutual Insurance Co., Storden Co-Operative Company, and Local Township Mutual Insurance Company. He died on January 5, 1954.

Education
Bondhus attended a public school prior to attending college. He attended college at the Minneapolis Business College and also had schooling at Minneapolis Normal School.

State Legislature
Bondhus served in the Minnesota House of Representatives from 1937 to 1952. He was preceded by C. A. Halverson and succeeded by Sam Franz. He was elected in nonpartisan elections, but he caucused in the conservative caucus.

Other government service
In addition to his service in the legislature, Bondhus served as both Township Treasurer and Township Assessor for Amo Township. He also served as assistant postmaster in Westbrook, Minnesota.

References

1880 births
1954 deaths
Members of the Minnesota House of Representatives
People from Clinton County, Iowa
People from Ida County, Iowa
People from Cottonwood County, Minnesota
20th-century American politicians